The National Amateur Cup is an annual knockout football competition that takes place in Malta.

The tournament is open to all the teams that take part in the National Amateur League, the third and last level of Maltese football and some teams from the Gozo Football League.

The teams that reach the quarter-final stage are allowed to take part in the Maltese FA Trophy preliminary round.

Format 
The tournament was created in 2020, following a general restructuring of the Maltese football system by the Malta Football Association. It was decided to create a new single-elimination competition reserved for the teams from the lower categories.

The first season of the cup started in October 2020 and it was interrupted and later declared cancelled on 9 April 2021 due to the decision of the MFA to stop all the competitions because of COVID-19 pandemic in Malta. Munxar Falcons and Żebbuġ Rovers were the first two Gozitan teams that played in the competition. The first actual winner of the competition was Żabbar St. Patrick, that won the cup in 2022. Zebbug Rovers were the first Gozitan team to pass through a round, when on the 8th of August 2022 they've beaten Pembroke Athleta F.C with a 6-2 scoreline, hence they were also the first Gozitan club that had beaten Maltese opposition in this competition. They made it to the round of last 16.

References

External links 
 Official page of the competition on mfa.com

1
National association football cups